Pablo Zuloaga Martínez (born 30 April 1981) is a Spanish politician from the Spanish Socialist Workers' Party who serves as Vice President of Cantabria and Regional Minister of Universities, Equality, Culture and Sport since July 2019.

References

1981 births
Politicians from Cantabria
Spanish Socialist Workers' Party politicians
Living people